Jocara thilloa is a species of snout moth. It is found in Guatemala.

References

Moths described in 1922
Jocara